Jules Devigne (22 February 1873 – 22 December 1935) was a French racecar driver.

Indy 500 results

References

1877 births
1935 deaths
French racing drivers
Indianapolis 500 drivers